The Pacemakers may refer to:
The Pacemakers (funk band), a band led by Bootsy Collins
The Pacemakers Drum and Bugle Corps
Gerry and the Pacemakers
 A series of five BBC2 programmes, transmitted February/March 1965, produced by Antony de Lotbiniere and written by Antony Jay